Raja Gang was a legendary hero in the area now known as Uttar Pradesh, India, and claimed founder of the town of Gangoh, which bears his name.

References

History of Uttar Pradesh